Stina Ehrensvärd is a Swedish-American entrepreneur, innovator and industrial designer. She is the founder and CEO of Yubico and co-inventor of the YubiKey authentication device.

Biography
Ehrensvärd was born in the United States. Her father, who was an architect like her mother, spent a year at the University of Washington in Seattle, undertaking research on urban planning and computer graphics. The following year, the family moved back to Lund, Sweden, where she grew up with three siblings. She went on to study industrial design at the Konstfack University College of Arts, Crafts and Design in Stockholm. It was around this time that she met her husband-to-be Jakob Ehrensvärd, an electronics enthusiast. They now have three children.

The two began collaborating on a series of innovations combining their design and computing talents. Their first significant joint development was Cypak, an intelligent pharmaceutical packaging system that did not take off. In 2007, the couple founded Yubico, and began manufacturing the YubiKey authentication device for account logins. The YubiKey quickly gained worldwide popularity and attracted millions of users, including nine of the top ten internet companies. In 2011, the couple moved to Palo Alto to become part of the Silicon Valley IT scene.

Yubico is a leading contributor to the FIDO Universal 2nd Factor (U2F) open authentication standard (co-authored with Google), and invented the concept of having one authentication device access any number of online services with no shared secrets. Under Ehrensvärd’s guidance, Yubico is the innovator behind driverless one-time password (OTP) authentication, PIV smart cards with touch-to-sign, and Hardware Security Modules that sit inside standard USB-ports.

Ehrensvärd also frequently speaks on internet identity and entrepreneurship. In 2013, she was listed in the monthly magazine Inc. as one of the "10 Women to Watch in Tech in 2013". The following year, Yubico was awarded the Swedish Innovation Award, and in 2016, she was awarded the KTH Great Prize, one of the most prestigious innovation and entrepreneur awards in Sweden.

In 2013, Ehrensvärd was interviewed by the business magazine The Next Woman about using the YubiKey for the first FIDO U2F pilot with Google. When asked if there was anything she wished to share with the community, she revealed: "We women are trained in our DNA to please.  I have stopped trying to please everyone, but to instead follow my dreams."

Ehrensvärd  continues to work towards her vision of bringing FIDO U2F to the masses, having one single YubiKey to an unlimited number of services, and making secure login easy and available for everyone. 

Ehrensvärd's company, Yubico, is also a supporter of the Hong Kong protests, having donated 500 encryption keys to the activists.

References

1967 births
Living people
Businesspeople from Seattle
American people of Swedish descent
Swedish business executives
Swedish women business executives
Swedish designers
Konstfack alumni